Polystictus  may refer to:
 Polystictus (bird), a genus of birds in the family Tyrannidae
 Polystictus (fungus), a genus of fungi in the family Hymenochaetaceae